Hyphoporus is a genus of beetles in the family Dytiscidae, containing the following species:

 Hyphoporus anitae Vazirani, 1969
 Hyphoporus aper Sharp, 1882
 Hyphoporus bengalensis Severin, 1890
 Hyphoporus bertrandi Vazirani, 1969
 Hyphoporus caliginosus Régimbart, 1899
 Hyphoporus dehraduni Vazirani, 1969
 Hyphoporus elevatus Sharp, 1882
 Hyphoporus geetae Vazirani, 1969
 Hyphoporus interpulsus (Walker, 1858)
 Hyphoporus josephi Vazirani, 1969
 Hyphoporus kempi Gschwendtner, 1936
 Hyphoporus montanus Régimbart, 1899
 Hyphoporus nilghiricus Régimbart, 1903
 Hyphoporus pacistanus Guignot, 1959
 Hyphoporus pugnator Sharp, 1890
 Hyphoporus severini Régimbart, 1892
 Hyphoporus solieri (Aubé, 1838)
 Hyphoporus subaequalis Vazirani, 1969
 Hyphoporus tonkinensis Régimbart, 1899

References

Dytiscidae